The Reading Rockets are an English semi-professional basketball club based in the town of Reading, England. Founded in 1997, the Rockets compete in NBL Division 1, the second tier of the British basketball system.

History
The Rockets were formed in 1997 by current owner Gary Johnson together with his son Matt, starting in Division 3. The club won promotion at the first attempt, and in the National Basketball League reorganisation of 2000, England Basketball  replaced Division 1 with the eight-team NBL Conference as the second-tier. Subsequently, Division 2 became Division 1 where the Rockets found themselves.

The Rockets remained in Division 1 for just one season, finishing second and beating Oxford in the Championship Final, thus winning promotion to the NBL Conference. In the 2001-02 season they finished seventh in the NBL Conference. In the following season, the Rockets continued their rise, finishing in third place. In 2003, the National Basketball League was rebranded as the English Basketball League, and once again was restructured with a new format, with Rockets finishing in second place in the new EBL Division 1. In the following season the Rockets finished third and were runners-up to Worthing Thunder in both the 2005-06 and 2006-07 seasons. 

The club completed its most successful season ever in 2008-09, going undefeated to win all four national championships. The club applied to join the British Basketball League (Top division of the British Basketball System) as a member franchise for the 2012–13 season but was unsuccessful. In the 2013-14 season the Rockets completed the treble and were Play Off Championship finalists. Rockets’ Ladies won the Division 2 Southern league in 2014.  As a stepping stone into the Senior Men’s team, the Rockets’ run academies at the John Madejski Academy and the Henley College.

The club has squads ranging from developing Under-12s to the Division 1 senior men's side, and coaching staff regularly visit local schools and run satellite clubs as part of the Community Rockets scheme.

In 2022, the Rockets applied to join the British Basketball League starting from the 2023–24 season.

Elite Basketball Academy
Reading Rockets are also partnered with John Madejski Academy, Of whom run one of the Elite Basketball Academies in the country. Since The Academy started in 2013, many players have come through the academy and have gone on to achieve many things since. Here are some notable former academy Students.

Men

Honours
 Men's National League Division 1 League Champions (3): 2008/2009, 2012/13, 2013/14
 Men's National Cup Winners (3): 2004/05, 2008/09, 2013/14
 Men's National League Division 1 Play Off Champions (4): 2005/06, 2008/09, 2010/11, 2012/13
 Men's National Trophy Winners (5): 2006/07, 2007/08, 2008/09, 2010/11, 2013/14

Players
Current squad

Notable former players

  E.J. Harrison
  Adam Kelly
  Ted Smith
  Tyrell Smith
  David Watts
  Niko Scott
  Ryan Lohfink
  Luke Nelson
  Matt Johnson
  Harrison Gamble
  Andy Powlesland
  Jermaine Williams
  Pem Bristol
  Danny Carter

Staff
Former head coaches

Season-by-season records

Record in BBL competitions

Women

Players
Current squad

Notable former players

  Cat Lutz-Sadler
  Steph Johnson
  Maike Delow
  Carmen Segura Moreno
  Sitota Gines Espinosa

Staff
Former head coaches

Honours
 Women's National League Division 2 Champions (1): 2013/14
 Women's National League Division 2 South West Champions (1): 2015/16 1

Season-by-season records

DNQ denotes Did Not Qualify.

See also
 Basketball in England

References

External links
 
 Basketball news at Reading Post

Basketball teams established in 1997
Basketball teams in England
Rockets
1997 establishments in England